Mothers-in-Law is a 1923 American silent drama film directed by Louis J. Gasnier and starring Ruth Clifford, Gaston Glass, and Vola Vale.

Cast
 Ruth Clifford as Vianna Courtleigh
 Gaston Glass as David Wingate
 Vola Vale as Ina Phillips
 Crauford Kent as Alden Van Buren
 Josef Swickard as Newton Wingate
 Edith Murgatroyd as 'Mom' Wingate 
 Doris Stone as Tessie Clark

References

Bibliography
 Munden, Kenneth White. The American Film Institute Catalog of Motion Pictures Produced in the United States, Part 1. University of California Press, 1997.

External links

 

1923 films
1923 drama films
1920s English-language films
American silent feature films
Silent American drama films
American black-and-white films
Films directed by Louis J. Gasnier
Preferred Pictures films
1920s American films